Nickel bis(dimethylglyoximate) is the coordination complex with the formula Ni[ONC(CH3)C(CH3)NOH]2.  The compound is a bright red solid.  It achieved prominence for its use in the qualitative analysis of nickel.

Structure
The geometry of the nickel(II) ion is square planar.  It is surrounded by two equivalents of the conjugate base (dmgH−) of dimethylglyoxime (dmgH2).  The pair of organic ligands are joined through hydrogen bonds to give a macrocyclic ligand.  The complex is distinctively colored and insoluble leading to its use as a chelating agent in the gravimetric analysis of nickel.  

The use of dimethylglyoxime as a reagent to detect nickel was reported by L. A. Chugaev in 1905.

References

Nickel complexes